The Monte-Carlo Sporting, also known as Sporting d'été, is a building complex in Larvotto, Monaco. It includes the Salle des Etoiles, a concert hall, and it is the main venue for society fundraisers in Monaco.

History
The Monte-Carlo Sporting was built by Group Pastor, a construction company chaired by Victor Pastor, from 1973 to 1974, and renovated in 1999. It is owned by the Société des bains de mer de Monaco (SBM). 

Many society fundraisers, formerly held at the Sporting d'Hiver, are now held at the Salle des Etoiles inside the Sporting d'été. It is home to the annual "Monte-Carlo Sporting Summer Festival", the Monte-Carlo Red Cross Ball and the Rose Ball.

References

Event venues in Monaco
Buildings and structures completed in 1974
Pastor family
World Music Awards